ShadowCon is a science fiction and fantasy convention, held in Oslo, Norway every year in July/August. It is held by The Shadow Project (TSP), a SF&F fandom society. ShadowCon is usually arranged at the Blindern campus of the University of Oslo. ShadowCon celebrated its 10th anniversary in 2006.

External links
Convention website

Science fiction conventions in Europe
Fantasy conventions
Culture in Oslo
Recurring events established in 1996